Jan Josef Švagr (7 September 1885, Týnčany – 26 March 1969, Claypole) was a Czech architect who worked mainly in Japan. He moved to Japan in 1923 and started working there, designing many buildings. Švagr left Japan due to the war in April 1941 to Latin America where he continued to participate in several projects. The following is a list of his works in Japan.

External links
MY FAVORITE ARCHITECTURE -J.J. Svagr- Japanese.

1885 births
1969 deaths
People from Příbram District
Czech architects
Czech expatriates in Japan
Czech expatriates in Argentina
Sons of Divine Providence